Claude C. Arnold (November 1, 1924 – December 23, 2016) was a Canadian football player who played for the Edmonton Eskimos. He won the Grey Cup with the Eskimos in 1954. He previously attended and played football at the University of Oklahoma, and was the quarterback of the school's first national championship team in 1950. He died in Oklahoma City in 2016 at the age of 92.

See also
 List of NCAA major college football yearly passing leaders

References

1924 births
2016 deaths
Edmonton Elks players
People from Okmulgee, Oklahoma
Oklahoma Sooners football players
Players of American football from Oklahoma
American football quarterbacks
Canadian football quarterbacks